The Great Chowder Cook-Off is an annual event that was held at the Newport Yachting Center in Newport, Rhode Island, USA for thirty-three years and is now held at Fort Adams State Park in Newport, RI. The event typically takes place in early or mid June. 

At first, the Cook-Off was open only to local chefs, but, more recently, there have been entries from as far away as Seattle, New York, Atlantic City, California, and Ireland.

History
The event was started in 1981 and was originally called the New England Clam Chowder Cook-Off, as New England clam chowder was the only type at the Cook-Off at that time. A creative category was added a few years later, though there was no award (as in the New England category); a seafood category was added the following year.  Awards were given in these categories, as well, starting with the 28th annual Great Chowder Cook-Off. The 28th introduced clam cakes, though again with no award, which came into play in its 29th year. The 30th had a clam cake-eating contest, repeated in 2013 (the 32nd Cook-Off).

The Cook-Off has been assisted by sponsors in recent years, and the name of the sponsor is added to the title of the event. The winner of the Cook-Off is announced at the end of the day, in addition to appearing in The Newport Daily News the next day.

In 2012 and 2013 (31st and 32nd Cook-Offs), the organizers created an additional entrance option: the "Chowderhead Club". These tickets are limited, unlike the normal ticket, allowing early entry and meeting chefs who will later be busy with group demonstrations. In 2011, Stefano’s Seafood Restaurant won the prize for best chowder, and, in 2012, they became the second restaurant to win two years in a row, along with The Mooring restaurant. The Mooring won one time during taping for the Food Network show Challenge. The show is primarily for baking, but it does have episodes with other focuses—one of which was the Great Chowder Cook-Off.

In 2015, the location of the Cook-Off was changed to Newport's Fort Adams State Park.

The Cook-Off was called off in 2020 due to the 2020 pandemic.

The event
Tickets are sold at the event and also online through the Newport Waterfront Events website, and vary in price by year; children age 12 & under are free with an adult. After paying for entry, attenders are entitled to the chowder provided by competing restaurants; beverages are available for purchase, both alcoholic and non-alcoholic.

The contest 
Over the years, the basic rules have stayed the same. Each attender is given a color-coded voting ticket for each category: Clam Chowder, Seafood Chowder, and most Spirited Team. Voters then drop their tickets into the bins of the restaurant or company whose chowder they enjoyed the most. The votes are counted about an hour before the event's end. Winners for each category are announced at 6 PM at the event and are immediately posted on the Newport Waterfront Events website.

References

Annual events in Rhode Island
Tourist attractions in Newport, Rhode Island
1981 establishments in Rhode Island
Recurring events established in 1981
Cooking competitions in the United States